The FIVB Volleyball Men's World Cup is an international volleyball competition contested by the senior men's national teams of the members of  (FIVB), the sport's global governing body. Initially the tournament was played in the year following the Olympic Games, except for 1973 when no tournament was held, but since 1991 the World Cup has been awarded in the year preceding the Olympic Games. The current champion is Brazil, which won its third title at the 2019 tournament.

The current format of the competition involves 12 teams, including the automatically qualifying host nation Japan, competing in the tournament phase for the title at venues within the host nation over a period of about two weeks. The World Cup (with exception of the 2019 edition) acts as the first qualification event for the following year's Olympic Games with the top two teams qualifying.

The 14 World Cup tournaments have been won by six different national teams. Russia have won six times (four as Soviet Union). The other World Cup winners are Brazil with 3 titles; United States with 2 titles; and Cuba, Italy and Germany (as East Germany), with one title each.

This tournament should not be confused with the FIVB Volleyball Men's World Championship.

History

Origins
The World Cup was created in 1965 with the purpose of partially filling the gap between the two most important volleyball tournaments, the Olympic Games and the World Championship, which take place in alternating 4-year cycles. The establishment of a third international competition would leave only one in every four years with no major events. The World Cup has a smaller entry than the World Championship, with at most 12 teams.

The World Cup was to be held in the year following the Olympic Games. The first two tournaments were for men's volleyball only; in 1973, a women's tournament was also introduced. Originally, each tournament had a different host, but in 1977 the competition was transferred to Japan on a permanent basis.

In the 1990s, the installment of annual international events such as the World League and the Grand Prix made the original motivations for the creation of the World Cup obsolete. Instead of letting a consolidated event disappear for lack of interest, the FIVB decided to change its format in 1991: it would be held in the year preceding, and not following, the Olympic Games; and it would be considered a first international Olympic qualification tournament, granting the winners a direct berth in the games.

This move saved the competition. The possibility of securing an early berth for the Olympic Games, thus avoiding extraneous and in some cases tight continental qualification procedures, became a consistent motivation for the national federations to participate in the World Cup. In 1995, the number of Olympic spots granted at the competition was increased to three, as it remained until 2011. In 2015 the number of spots was only two again.

2023 edition
With the change of qualification for the Paris Summer Olympics, the 2023 World Cup will serve as one of the three Olympic qualification tournaments. Only eight teams will participate in this edition, with two tickets to Paris Olympics for the top two teams.

Winners
Russia (considered as the inheritors of the records of the former Soviet Union), Brazil and United States are the only teams that have won the Men's World Cup more than once.

The Soviets took the gold at the opening edition of the tournament, in 1965. Four years later, the winner was also a socialist nation, East Germany.

Scheduled for Uruguay, the 1973 edition was cancelled. In 1977, competition was resumed in Japan, and the Soviet Union came back for two wins in a row. In 1985, they were once again runners-up, but lost the decisive match to United States in five sets. In 1989, Cuba surprised the world and beat a rising Italy to take the gold.

With the competition now set as a qualifying event for the Olympic Games, the Soviet Union, led by Dmitri Fomin won the title in 1991, at the brink of dissolution. The Italians, who hadn't participated in this edition, finally conquered their gold medal in 1995. Inheriting a large part of the former Soviet volleyball programme, Russia were the winners in 1999.

The following two editions, played in 2003 and 2007 respectively, were won by favorites Brazil. In 2011, Russia regained the title, while the 2015 edition was won by the United States for the second time. Brazil won the title for the third time in 2019.

Competition formula
The World Cup is the most stable from all competition formulas employed by the FIVB. The following rules apply:

The competition takes place in Japan.
Twelve teams participate in each event: ten qualified, two per invitation.
Japan are always pre-qualified as host nation.
The winners of the FIVB World Championship in the previous year are automatically granted a spot.
The champion and runner-up of each continental tournament of that year are granted two spots.
Since the 1999 edition, only teams not yet qualified for the following Olympic Games can compete in the World Cup; hence hosts of the following year's Olympic Games are not allowed to compete. There will be an exception for the 2019 World Cup, as the tournament will be hosted by Japan and the country will host the 2020 Summer Olympics.
The competition is divided in exactly two phases (called "legs").
Teams are divided in two pools.
At the first leg, each team plays one match against all other teams in its pool.
At the second leg, each team plays one match against all the teams in the other pool.
Matches take place continuously through two weeks, with one-day breaks every two or three days. Each day, six matches are played.
Final standings are calculated by usual volleyball criteria: match points, numbers of matches won, sets ratio (the total number of sets won divided by the total number of sets lost), points ratio, direct confrontation.
Top two teams in overall standings, regardless of pools, qualify for the following Olympic Games.
The tournament implements very tight line-up restrictions: only twelve players are allowed, and no replacement is permitted, even in the case of injuries.

Results summary

Medals summary

Debut of national teams

Participating nations
Legend
 – Champions
 – Runners-up
 – Third place
 – Fourth place
 – Did not enter / Did not qualify
 – Hosts
= – More than one team tied for that rank
Q – Qualified for forthcoming tournament

MVP by edition
1977 – 
1981 – 
1985 – 
1989 – 
1991 – 
1995 – 
1999 – 
2003 – 
2007 – 
2011 – 
2015 – 
2019 – 
2023 – TBD

See also

Volleyball at the Summer Olympics
FIVB Volleyball Women's World Cup
FIVB Volleyball Men's World Championship
FIVB Volleyball World Grand Champions Cup
FIVB Volleyball World League
FIVB Volleyball Men's Nations League
List of Indoor Volleyball World Medalists

Notes

References

External links

 

 
 
V
International volleyball competitions
International men's volleyball competitions
Quadrennial sporting events
World cups